Ranchi - Jamshedpur Expressway is an Expressway in the state of Jharkhand which links two key cities of Jharkhand and East India that is Ranchi and Jamshedpur. It is constructed on NH 43. It is a four lane highway.

References

Expressways in India
Roads in India
Transport in Ranchi
Transport in Jamshedpur